Diogo Pinto de Freitas do Amaral (21 July 1941 – 3 October 2019), known as Freitas do Amaral, was a Portuguese politician and law professor. He was Minister of Foreign Affairs from 10 January 1980 to 12 January 1981 and from 12 March 2005 to 3 July 2006. He also served briefly as Prime Minister in an interim capacity in the early 1980s.

Background
He was born in Póvoa de Varzim, Portugal, the third but first surviving son of Duarte de Freitas do Amaral and wife Maria Filomena de Campos Trocado, and the older brother of João de Freitas do Amaral.

Career
He was a Licentiate and a Doctorate in Law specialised in Administrative Law and Political Science from the Faculty of Law of the University of Lisbon, and a Cathedratic Professor in the Faculty of Law at the New University of Lisbon and also a publicist.

He served as a professor in the Faculty of Law of the Lusófona University of Lisbon, where he taught and governed as the chair of the Economics of Public Law in Law degree, developing other teaching activities in the same college.

In 1974, some months after the Carnation Revolution, he was one of the Founders and President of then Democratic and Social Centre (CDS), a Christian democratic party. He led this party till 1985, and again from 1988 to 1991. He served as a Deputy to the Assembly of the Republic (the Portuguese parliament) from 1975 to 1982 or 1983, and again in 1992 and 1993.

He was also a Member of the Portuguese Council of State (1974–1982).

In the parliamentary elections of 1979 and 1980, the Democratic Alliance (of which the CDS was a part) won a majority and formed the government, in which Freitas served as Deputy Prime Minister or Vice-Prime-Minister and Minister of Foreign Affairs in 1980 and Deputy Prime Minister or Vice-Prime-Minister and Minister of Defence between 1981 and 1983. After the death of Francisco Sá Carneiro, Freitas do Amaral was interim Prime Minister for a short period between 1980 and 1981. Between 1981 and 1982 he was also the President of the European People's Party.

He was a candidate in 1985 for the presidency in the 1986 presidential election. Supported by his own People's Party and by the Social Democratic Party, he established a commanding lead in the first round, but lost the second round by some 150,000 votes to Mário Soares, who was endorsed by the two eliminated candidates.

He was President of the United Nations General Assembly (1995–1996).

A European federalist, he left the party he founded, disagreeing mainly with the Eurosceptic line followed by Manuel Monteiro and Paulo Portas.

Always seen as a right-winger, Freitas do Amaral supported the Social Democratic Party in the parliamentary election of 2002. However, disappointed with the government performance, and critical of its support for the U.S. invasion of Iraq, Freitas do Amaral surprised many observers by announcing his support for the Socialist Party in the 2005 election. He was subsequently nominated for Minister of State and Minister of Foreign Affairs of the XVII Constitutional Government, led by the Socialist leader José Sócrates. He resigned after a little over one year in office, citing health reasons and, as revealed to a newspaper, tiredness resulting from the many diplomatic trips taken.

He was also a Juridical Consultant of many companies.

He authored a biography of King Afonso I and a play about Viriatus.

He also published a study of the actuality and reform of the prison system in Portugal.

Honours
 Grand-Cross of the Order of Merit of the Italian Republic, Italy (3 November 1980)
 Grand-Cross of the Order of St. Olav, Norway (3 November 1980)
 Grand-Cross of the Order of Merit, Germany (22 December 1980)
  Grand-Cross of the Order of Christ, Portugal (3 August 1983)
  Grand Cross of the Order of Prince Henry, Portugal (9 June 1984)
 Grand Cross of the Order of Saint James of the Sword, Portugal (9 June 2003)
 Commander of National Order of Merit, France (27 January 2006)
 First Class of the Order of the White Star, Estonia (29 March 2006)

Personal life
He married in Sintra, Santa Maria, on 31 July 1965 Maria José Salgado Sarmento de Matos, born in Lisbon on 13 October 1943, writer under the pseudonym Maria Roma, daughter of José Sarmento Osório de Vasconcelos de Matos (Moimenta da Beira, 28 July 1909 – Sintra, 17 July 1992). They had four children.

In September 2019, Freitas do Amaral was hospitalized in critical condition at a Cascais hospital. On 3 October 2019, it was announced that Freitas do Amaral had died.

Electoral results

1986 Portuguese presidential election

|-
!style="background-color:#E9E9E9" align=left colspan="2" rowspan="2"|Candidates
!style="background-color:#E9E9E9" align=left rowspan="2"|Supporting parties 	
!style="background-color:#E9E9E9" align=right colspan="2"|First round
!style="background-color:#E9E9E9" align=right colspan="2"|Second round
|-
!style="background-color:#E9E9E9" align=right|Votes
!style="background-color:#E9E9E9" align=right|%
!style="background-color:#E9E9E9" align=right|Votes
!style="background-color:#E9E9E9" align=right|%
|-
|style="width: 9px" bgcolor=#FF66FF align="center" | 
|align=left|Mário Soares
|align=left|Socialist Party
|align="right" |1,443,683
|align="right" |25.43
|align="right" |3,010,756
|align="right" |51.18
|-
|style="width: 8px" bgcolor=#0093DD align="center" | 
|align=left|Diogo Freitas do Amaral
|align=left|Democratic Social Centre, Social Democratic Party
|align="right" |2,629,597	
|align="right" |46.31
|align="right" |2,872,064	
|align="right" |48.82
|-
|style="width: 8px" bgcolor=red align="center" | 
|align=left|Francisco Salgado Zenha
|align=left|Portuguese Communist Party, Democratic Renovator Party
|align="right" |1,185,867
|align="right" |20.88
|colspan="2" rowspan="3"| 
|-
|style="width: 8px" bgcolor=gray align="center" |
|align=left|Maria de Lourdes Pintasilgo
|align=left|Independent
|align="right" |418,961
|align="right" |7.38
|-
|style="width: 8px" bgcolor=red align="center" |
|align=left|Ângelo Veloso
|align=left|Portuguese Communist Party
|colspan="2" align="center" |left the race
|-
|colspan="3" align=left style="background-color:#E9E9E9"|Total valid
|width="65" align="right" style="background-color:#E9E9E9"|5,677,525
|width="40" align="right" style="background-color:#E9E9E9"|100.00
|width="65" align="right" style="background-color:#E9E9E9"|5,882,820
|width="40" align="right" style="background-color:#E9E9E9"|100.00
|-
|align=right colspan="3"|Blank ballots
|width="65" align="right" |46,334
|width="40" align="right" |0.81
|width="65" align="right" |33,844
|width="40" align="right" |0.57
|-
|align=right colspan="3" |Invalid ballots
|width="65" align="right"|18,292
|width="40" align="right"|0.32
|width="65" align="right"|20,436
|width="40" align="right"|0.34
|-
|colspan="3" align=left style="background-color:#E9E9E9"|Total (turnout 75.38% and 77.99%)
|width="65" align="right" style="background-color:#E9E9E9"|5,742,151 
|width="40" align="right" style="background-color:#E9E9E9"|
|width="65" align="right" style="background-color:#E9E9E9"|5,937,100 
|width="40" align="right" style="background-color:#E9E9E9"|
|-
| colspan=7 align=left|He left the race in favor of Salgado Zenha.
|-
|colspan=7 align=left|Source: Comissão Nacional de Eleições
|}

Ancestors

Books
 D. Afonso Henriques biografia. Lisboa: Bertrand, 2009
 Camarate: um caso ainda em aberto : apelo de um cidadão. Lisboa: Bertrand, 2010.

References

 Anuário da Nobreza de Portugal, III, 2006, Tomo IV, pp. 862–873
 Costados, Gonçalo de Mesquita da Silveira de Vasconcelos e Sousa, Livraria Esquina, 1.ª Edição, Porto, 1997, N.º 55

1941 births
2019 deaths
People from Póvoa de Varzim
University of Lisbon alumni
Prime Ministers of Portugal
Foreign ministers of Portugal
Presidents of the United Nations General Assembly
Members of the Assembly of the Republic (Portugal)
Candidates for President of Portugal
Permanent Representatives of Portugal to the United Nations
CDS – People's Party politicians
Grand Crosses 1st class of the Order of Merit of the Federal Republic of Germany
Recipients of the Order of the White Star, 1st Class
Freitas do Amaral family
Ministers of National Defence of Portugal